Marijana Mišković Hasanbegović is a Croatian judoka. At the 2012 Summer Olympics she competed in the Women's 63 kg, but was defeated in the second round.

References

External links
 
 
 

Croatian female judoka
Living people
Olympic judoka of Croatia
Judoka at the 2012 Summer Olympics
Mediterranean Games gold medalists for Croatia
Competitors at the 2013 Mediterranean Games
Mediterranean Games medalists in judo
European Games competitors for Croatia
Judoka at the 2015 European Games
1982 births
21st-century Croatian women